William Baker (14 September 1836) was a New South Wales Marine and member of the First Fleet that founded the European penal colony of New South Wales.

Initially an orderly for the colony's first Governor, Arthur Phillip, Baker was later appointed government storekeeper in Parramatta, and storekeeper and superintendent of convicts in the rural settlement of Hawkesbury. In 1810 he was dismissed from all government posts after being found to have misused his position for personal gain, and relocated to Hobart where he became the inaugural crier for Australia's oldest colony-wide judicature, the Supreme Court of Van Diemen's Land.

The Australian fish Latropiscis purpurissatus, or "Sergeant Baker", is named in his honour.

Early life

There are no surviving records of Baker's life prior to enlistment in the New South Wales Marine Corps at the age of 26. Enlistment requirements mandated that members of the New South Wales Corps were at least five and a half feet tall, with previous satisfactory service in the British Marines and the appearance of being among " the stoutest, fittest and healthiest [of] men".

Voyage on First Fleet
Baker joined the First Fleet to New South Wales in 1787 as a Marine corporal of the 53rd (Portsmouth) Company, embarked aboard the convict transport . The Fleet set sail from Portsmouth on 13 May 1787. Two days later Baker was severely wounded when he accidentally shot himself in the foot, having placed his loaded musket on the deck while preparing for guard duty. Ship's surgeon John White treated the wound, and reported a significant injury to the right ankle:

"The bones, after being a good deal shattered, turned the (musket) ball which, taking another direction, had still force enough left to go through a harness cask full of beef at some distance, and after that to kill two geese who were on the other side of it."

Baker was incapacitated for three months, but took pains to advance his recovery through exercise and careful tending of the wound. To the surprise of his shipmates he had recovered sufficiently to resume active duty when the Fleet reached Rio de Janeiro in August 1787. Surgeon White recorded that Baker had regained "the perfect use of the wounded leg", which he credited to Baker's youth and "good habit of body".

Marine Service in New South Wales

The Fleet arrived in New South Wales in January 1788, with the Marines disembarking first at Botany Bay. Six days later they reboarded the ships for the voyage to Port Jackson, where they were reorganised into four companies under the commands of Captains James Campbell and John Shea, and Captain-Lieutenants Watkin Tench and James Meredith. Baker was promoted to sergeant and assigned to Tench's company alongside fellow sergeants William Perry and  Edward Campion. He was further appointed as orderly to the colony's Governor, Arthur Phillip, an administrative office that relieved him of routine duties such as supervising the landing of convicts or clearing trees and undergrowth for the building of the settlement.

Immediately on arrival in Port Jackson Baker also took a common-law wife from among the convicts – 25-year-old Susannah Huffnell, who had been sentenced to seven years transportation for petty larceny. Their only child, Elizabeth, was born on 1 January 1789. The relationship was not a happy one and Baker refused to accompany his wife and child when they were transferred to the remote colonial outpost of Norfolk Island in March 1790. Susannah and Elizabeth had no further contact with Baker, even after they returned to Sydney in the 1800s.

Baker's Marine service was uneventful, and his name rarely appears in colonial records for this period. He was an enthusiastic fisherman and may have been the first to catch Latropiscis purpurissatus, a common species along the New South Wales coast and described as "growing to more than two feet, coloured red to violet blue with red and yellow tail fin", and "edible, but not greatly esteemed". The fish was named in his honour in 1843.

Marine Corps' terms of enlistment were for three years, with Baker's service expiring in 1791. The bulk of the Marine force departed in December of that year aboard , leaving sixty men behind under the command of Lieutenant John Poulden to support the newly established New South Wales Corps. Baker also remained in the colony, continuing his duties as orderly to Governor Phillip. He returned to England in December 1792, in company with Phillip and the remaining Marines as passengers aboard the convict transport Atlantic.

Civilian life
On arrival in England, Baker declined re-enlistment into the British Marines and returned to civilian life. Within six months he received an appointment from the Navy Board to act as civilian superintendent of convicts aboard the transport vessel Surprize, which departed for New South Wales in early 1794. A British loyalist, Baker took an immediate dislike to four of the convicts under his watch, sentenced for political offences and collectively known as Scottish Martyrs. Late in the voyage he advised Surprizes captain Patrick Campbell that the Martyrs planned to mutiny and seize the vessel. Acting on Baker's word, Campbell had three of the four confined until Surprize reached Sydney Cove.

Farmer and storekeeper

On reaching Sydney Baker resigned his Navy position and sought opportunities as a farmer. His interests were assisted by the deregulation of land grants under Governor Phillip's successor, Francis Grose. To supplement his farming income he petitioned for administrative employment and was appointed storekeeper in Parramatta in January 1795, supervising distribution and security of military and civilian supplies. On 26 August 1795, having comfortably established himself as a farmer and government agent, Baker married former convict Elizabeth Lavender.

Two months later Governor John Hunter appointed him superintendent of convicts for the Hawkesbury region, a newly established area of farms to the northwest of Baker's own lands. His reputation was somewhat marred by a 1797 conviction for stealing a boat worth £16 from a neighbour, Thomas Raby. Baker admitted possession of the vessel but denied it was Raby's. He was found guilty of theft and fined a proportion of the vessel's value.

In 1798 Baker received a third official appointment, as government storekeeper for the Hawkesbury region in addition to his equivalent duties in Parramatta. Despite his past experience, Baker was quickly found wanting in the management of the stores, specifically those for farmers near the settlement of Windsor. In 1798 the local grain harvest was too large to be receipted and stored in the Windsor storehouse, so Baker elected to fill that store solely with produce supplied by the region's three largest landholders. In consequence, smaller farmers at Windsor had no means of selling or storing their grain and were brought close to bankruptcy. Baker was deaf to their complaints, and Governor Hunter was forced to intervene in person to keep the peace. In a letter on 19 April, sent via the New South Wales Corps commander in Hawkesbury, Hunter directed Baker to return half of the harvest he had already stored, and instead fill the storehouse with goods from smaller farms.

Regardless of this setback, the following years were personally prosperous for Baker. Baker's dealings in this period were not particularly honest; in 1800 he refused to pay a government debt of £86 owed for use of two servants that had worked on his farm since 1798, and historian Brian Fletcher has suggested he also misappropriated supplies and labour from his own government store. No action was taken against Baker for these offences, and with ready access to resources he was able to swiftly clear and farm his properties.

Land grant records in 1801 indicate that Baker had twelve acres of maize and wheat under cultivation with another twelve acres lying fallow, and that he owned one horse, four goats and 22 hogs. His two unpaid servants were recorded as still being present on the farm. 

The history of William Baker at the Hawkesbury has been confusing for many, unaware that there were two William Bakers residing in the district at the same time, and within a short period of time owning the same land in Windsor and at Bakers Lagoon at Richmond Bottoms, also known as Cornwallis. The first William Baker was the Storekeeper at Green Hills, to avoid confusion he was known as Mr William Baker or William Baker Storekeeper. The second William Baker was the ex-convict from the Neptune 1790, proprietor of the Royal Oak Inn in Baker Street, Windsor. He was know as William Baker Settler or William Baker Junior. The storekeeper was granted the 30 acre Whitehouse Farm which was separated from the government precinct at Green Hills by Baker's Line. Over time the storekeeper sold off much of his farm and was dismissed by Governor Macquarie in 1810. In 1810 William Baker Settler purchased a portion of Whitehouse Farm on Baker's Line from Matthew Everingham, this became the location of his Royal Oak Inn. When Governor Macquarie establish his Windsor town he incorporated the Green Hills domain into his new town and renamed Baker's Line as Baker Street. By this time the storekeeper had been dismissed and left the district,  it was William Baker Settler who had his Royal Oak Inn on Baker Street. As both William Baker Storekeeper and William Baker Settler had a connection to Baker's Line, which became Baker Street, it is fair to acknowledge it was named to commemorate both gentlemen.

Dismissal
Baker supported Governor William Blighs attempts to regulate liquor imports, and signed a letter to this effect in 1807. Despite this, he publicly welcomed Bligh's overthrow in the 1808 Rum Rebellion and congratulated former Marines officer George Johnston for helping seize executive authority on behalf of the New South Wales Corps. In so doing he drew the attention of Bligh's replacement, Governor Lachlan Macquarie, who commenced an investigation into accusations that Baker had unfairly treated Hawkesbury settlers by appropriating supplies from the government store. The accusations were upheld and in 1810 Baker was dismissed from all his government posts.

Life in Hobart

His business interests having collapsed, Baker abandoned his farm and relocated from New South Wales to the southern settlement of Hobart in Van Diemen's Land. In 1814 he is recorded as holding the office of government storekeeper in Hobart. A year later, at an approximate age of 54, he accepted a job as town crier for the newly created Deputy Judge Advocate's Court, calling witnesses and announcing verdicts on the roadside outside the courthouse. Any remaining business links with New South Wales were severed in 1819 with the sale of Baker's former farm to a colleague, Samuel Terry, who had recently visited him in Hobart. His wife, Elizabeth Baker, died in April 1824 and was buried in Hobart Cemetery.

The Supreme Court of Van Diemen's Land was established by The Royal Letters Patent of 13 October 1823 and commenced activities on 10 May 1824, with Baker as its inaugural crier. This would be Baker's last and longest occupation.  In February 1836 he received his first pay rise since becoming crier, being granted an extra £20. A contemporary reference applauded Baker's respectable appearance as crier but noted that he was "in the habit of sometimes getting tipsy" while performing his tasks.

Death
Baker died in Hobart on 14 September 1836, at the age of 75. At the time of his death he owned 230 acres of uncultivated land at Argyle and Ulva, Van Diemen's Land.

Again confusion arises at Richmond Bottoms, over the two William Bakers. Both William Baker Storekeeper and William Baker Settler owned the same farm here. Although it is called Bakers Lagoon neither actually owned the lagoon, it was Crown land later granted to the neighbouring landowners, which included William Baker Settler's sons-in-law. William Baker Storekeeper consolidated four soldier blocks into a 100 acre farm known as Gypsies Retreat, planted a crop of wheat on two acres, very soon after Baker sold the land to William Bampton, a sea captain.  When William Baker Settler purchased the land from Charles Grimes, the deputy-surveyor in 1802, he fenced in his pigs from a deep waterhole and the area became known as Baker's Lagoon after William Baker Settler who was living on and farming the lowlands. The lagoon is located between the Hawkesbury River and the town of Richmond.
Again to it good to acknowledge both William Bakers in the naming of the lagoon.

Notes

Footnotes

Citations

References

1761 births
1836 deaths
Settlers of Australia
18th-century Royal Marines personnel
Place of birth unknown
Place of birth missing
First Fleet